Dinninup is a small town in the South West region of Western Australia. It is between Boyup Brook and Kojonup.

The town's name is Aboriginal in origin and is the name of a brook that is situated close to town. The name was first recorded by surveyors in 1877; the meaning is unknown. Originating as a railway station on the Boyup Brook to Kojonup line, the land was requested by early settlers to be set aside for a townsite in 1906. The line was completed in 1910 and the Dinninup station was opened at the same time. The town was gazetted in 1915.

References

Towns in Western Australia
South West (Western Australia)